The following is a list of churches in West Dorset.

List 

 St. Mary's Church, Bridport
 St Michael and All Angels Church, Littlebredy
Church of St Candida and Holy Cross
 Holy Trinity Church, Fleet
 Holy Trinity Old Church, Bothenhampton
St Peter's Church, Eype

West Dorset
West Dorset